Gøril Kringen (born 28 January 1972) is a Norwegian former football player and coach, who has also worked as the Football Association of Norway's (NFF) head of women's football. As a player, she was an Olympic champion with the Norway women's national football team. She played club football for Trondheims-Ørn, and holds the record for total matches played for the club (515).

Playing career
Playing for SK Trondheims-Ørn, Kringen won the Norwegian league seven times between 1994 and 2003. She also won the Norwegian Women's Cup eight times with Trondheims-Ørn.

Kringen made her senior national team debut in July 1995—a 2–0 win over Australia—but she was not selected for Norway's victorious 1995 FIFA Women's World Cup squad. She was on the Norwegian team that hosted UEFA Women's Euro 1997 and then finished fourth at the 1999 FIFA Women's World Cup in the United States.

She collected a total of 72 caps for Norway and won gold at the 2000 Summer Olympics in Sydney. She was Norway's captain in their UEFA Women's Euro 2001 campaign, which ended with a 1–0 defeat by hosts Germany in the semi-final.

Coaching career

Kringen coached Trondheims-Ørn (2006–2010) and has also coached Norway's Under-23 team. In 2012 Kringen served as an assistant coach at Ranheim Fotball in the Norwegian [men's] First Division. She was the first woman to coach a team in the top two levels of the Norwegian football league system.

In May 2013 Kringen was appointed the Football Association of Norway's (NFF) head of women's football.

References

External links

 
 Norwegian national team profile 
 Trondheims-Ørn club profile 

1972 births
Living people
Norwegian women's footballers
Footballers at the 2000 Summer Olympics
Olympic footballers of Norway
Olympic gold medalists for Norway
Olympic medalists in football
Norwegian women's football managers
Norway women's international footballers
Toppserien players
SK Trondheims-Ørn players
1999 FIFA Women's World Cup players
Footballers from Trondheim
Medalists at the 2000 Summer Olympics
Women's association football defenders
IL Stjørdals-Blink players